Bonagota is a genus of moths belonging to the family Tortricidae.

Species
Bonagota arizonae  Razowski & Becker, 2000
Bonagota bogotana  Walker, 1863
Bonagota chiapasana  Razowski & Becker, 2000
Bonagota costaricana  Razowski & Becker, 2000
Bonagota dominicana  Razowski, 1999
Bonagota melanecta  Meyrick, 1917
Bonagota mexicana  Razowski & Becker, 2000
Bonagota moronaecola  Razowski & Wojtusiak, 2006
Bonagota piosana  Razowski & Wojtusiak, 2006
Bonagota salubricola  Meyrick, 1931

References

 , 2005: World Catalogue of Insects vol. 5 Tortricidae.
 , 1987, Sci. Nat. 52(1986): 22.
 , 2000: Revision of the New World Euliini - genus Bonagota Razowski, with notes on Apotomops Powell & Obraztsov (Lepidoptera: Tortricidae). Polish Journal of Entomology 69 (1): 65-76.
 , 2006: Tortricidae (Lepidoptera) from the Valley of Río Gualaceo, East Cordillera in Ecuador, with descriptions of new taxa. Acta Zoologica Cracoviensia 49B (1-2): 17-53. Full article:  
 , 2006: Tortricidae from Venezuela (Lepidoptera: Tortricidae). Shilap Revista de Lepidopterologia 34 (133): 35-79.

External links
tortricidae.com

Euliini
Tortricidae genera